The Blackhead Formation is an Ediacaran geological formation cropping out in Eastern Newfoundland, with five subdivisions, two of which are named: the Maddox Cove and Deadman's Bay members.

References

Ediacaran Newfoundland and Labrador